Santa Rosa is a small city in the Canelones Department of southern Uruguay.

Santa Rosa is also the name of the municipality to which the city belongs.

Geography

Location
Other nearby towns are: San Bautista  to the northeast, San Antonio  to the northwest, San Jacinto  to the east and Sauce  to the south.

History
It was declared a "Pueblo" (village) by Decree of 19 August 1879. On 15 May 1925 its status was elevated to "Villa" (town) by the Act of Ley Nº 7.837, and then on 29 August 1972 to "Ciudad" (city) by the Act of Ley Nº 14.081.

Population
According to the 2011 census, Santa Rosa had a population of 3,727. In 2010, the Intendencia de Canelones had estimated a population of 7,749 for the municipality during the elections.

 
Source: Instituto Nacional de Estadística de Uruguay

Places of worship
 St. Rose of Lima Parish Church (Roman Catholic)

References

External links

INE map of Santa Rosa

Populated places in the Canelones Department